The Ethnosport Cultural Festival is a 5-day sport and culture festival held annually. Sporting and cultural activities of the Anatolia, Central Asia and the greater Turkic world, but also Japanese, Middle Eastern and other, are held.

For the festival, Yenikapi Square is transformed into a traditional looking Turkic- central Asian village with traditional tents, traditional sports fields and horse areas. 150 horses were involved in the 2018 edition.

13 of the tents are set up by different Turkic countries and communities with a 14th tent for Qatar in the 2018 edition.

Traditional crafts and dance are among the workshops given in the tents around the festival grounds.
Over 880 athletes participated in the 13 ethnosports in the latest (3rd) edition.

Sports

As of the third edition there are 13 different ethnosports in which athletes compete in. These include aba wrestling, shalwar wrestling, brace wrestling, oil wrestling and mounted archery.

In the third edition, Yabusame (traditional Japanese horseback archery) and falcon racing were also featured.

Oil wrestling

Oil wrestling is a sport in which two opponents covered in olive oil wrestle each other. Due to the olive oil, gripping the opponent is made much more difficult and thus ads a level of complexity to the sport as compared to the non oiled Greco-Roman wrestling. It is said that it was practiced by the ancients 4500 years ago but it has at least been practiced since the Ottoman conquest of Rumelia.

Originally the wrestling would continue until one of the wrestlers is overpowered however later on a point system was added. At the first oil wrestling tournament which lasted for 3 days it is said that in the final round two brothers wrestled each other and neither one was able to outplay the other and they ended up dying of exhaustion. The Kırkpınar tournament continues today in their spirit.

The wrestling takes place on a grassy patch of earth which is designated as the (Turkish:Er Meydanı).

It is considered an inseparable part of Turkish culture.

Shalwar wrestling
The opponents in this sport wrestle each other barefoot and wearing shalwars.

Brace wrestling
(Turkish:KUŞAK GÜREŞİ) or (Crimean:küreş)

Mounted jarid

A sport where Jarids are used on horseback.

Mounted archery

Archery on horseback.

Archery

Talus bone games
The game consist of players placing their goat or cow anklebones in the center of a circle and then knocking them out. There are 3 different variants that can be played to the game.

Kökbörü

(Kazakh:kokpar)
kökbörü

Aba wrestling
In this type of wrestling the wrestlers wear abes on their backs.

Mas wrestling

Mas wrestling a.k.a. In the middle of the platform there is a plank which is strongly fixed platform on its side. The two opponent sit on either sides of the plank with their feet on the plank and they put their arms forward and hold a rod together. Then using virtually all the muscles in the body and pull on the rod.

Mangala

Yabusame

Falconry

Organisation
The event is organised by the World Ethnosports Federation and sponsored by Anadolu Agency.

Venue

The 2018 event has taken place at Yenikapi, Istanbul.

Slogan
Every year the festival has a new slogan. In 2018 it was: The horse belongs to those who ride it and the sword to those who gird it on.

See also
 World Nomad Games
 Ethnosport

References

External links
 World Ethnosports Federation

Recurring sporting events established in 2016
Multi-sport events in Turkey
Sport in Fatih
2016 establishments in Turkey
Traditional sports
Festivals in Turkey